The Nibela Peninsula is the northern peninsula that separates False Bay from the main portion of Lake St Lucia in KwaZulu-Natal, South Africa.

Landforms of KwaZulu-Natal
Peninsulas of South Africa